Erie Airport may refer to:

 Erie International Airport near Erie, Pennsylvania, United States (IATA/FAA: ERI)
 Erie Municipal Airport in Erie, Colorado, United States (FAA: EIK)
 Erie-Ottawa Regional Airport in Ottawa County, Ohio, United States (FAA: PCW)